Bhabiana  is a village in Phagwara Tehsil in Kapurthala district of Punjab State, India. The village is administrated by a Sarpanch who is an elected representative of village as per the constitution of India and Panchayati raj (India).

Transport 
There is no railway station near to Bhabiana village in less than 10 km. However Jalandhar City Railway  Station is major railway station 21 km near to the village.  The village is 114 km away from Sri Guru Ram Dass Jee International Airport in Amritsar and the another nearest airport is Sahnewal Airport  in Ludhiana which is located 53 km away from the village.  Phagwara, Jandiala, Jalandhar, Hoshiarpur are the nearby cities to Bhabiana village.

Nearby villages 
 Babeli 
 Bir Dhadoli
 Dhadoli
 Dhak Chair
 Dhak Manak 
 Domeli
 Dug
 Malikpur
 Manak
 Rampur Sunran
 Sahni

References

External links
  Villages in Kapurthala
 Kapurthala Villages List

Villages in Kapurthala district